Myxoid lipoblastoma is a cutaneous condition characterized by excess mucin. It resembles myxoid liposarcoma.

See also 
 Benign lipoblastomatosis
 List of cutaneous conditions

References 

Mucinoses